The Volvo B7L is a fully low floor single-decker bus, double-decker bus and articulated bus chassis with a rear engine mounted vertically on the left of the rear overhang. It was built as a replacement for the Volvo B10L, and the Volvo Olympian. It was used as both a single-decker bus and a double-decker bus chassis largely in Continental Europe.

The B7L was also available as an integrally-constructed Volvo bus - the Volvo 5000 (later replaced by 7500, with aluminium structure) and Volvo 7000 (later renumbered 7700, with stainless steel structure).

Whilst similar to the B10L in design, both featuring a side-mounted engine, the B7L's engine was a Volvo D7C unit mounted vertically, as opposed to the horizontally mounted Volvo DH10/GH10 engine of the B10L; the radiator was mounted above the engine instead of the right-hand side, allowing the floor to be lower behind the rear axle. As with the B10L, B7L was also available in its articulated form named the B7LA. Unlike B10L, the B7L was available only with diesel engines. Integrally constructed Volvo 7000 bus was bodied, with CNG engines, on B10L chassis only. CNG engines were reintroduced in B9L chassis.

Outside Continental Europe, the B7L was introduced in the United Kingdom in 2000, as a replacement for the Volvo B10BLE, and the Volvo Olympian. It could be fitted with Wright Eclipse body (and Eclipse Fusion body for B7LA), but proved unpopular due to the arrangement of engine and radiator limiting seating capacity, with FirstGroup being the only major customer. Volvo responded by introducing the B7RLE and the B7TL for the UK market, fitted with more conventional Transverse engines. In Ireland, Bus Éireann purchased 25 B7L's between 2001 & 2003. The double-decker version of B7L was also sold in UK, used as public bus (East Lancs Nordic body) or sightseeing bus (Ayats Bravo City open-top body).

Volvo B7L and B7LA-based buses are used in Greece. In Athens, Volvo B7LAs constructed by Saracakis have been used since 1999. In Thessaloniki, the local operator OASTH introduced 22 B7LAs in 2004 with more coming in 2005 and 2006, while 54 B7Ls were introduced in 2004 and 2005 together with 15 11m B7Ls also in 2005 all constructed by ELVO.

Volvo B7L used in Israel as well, but the bodyworks were Mercury by Merkavim and Hispano Habit. Mercury had Voith D864.3E transmission while Hispano had ZF Ecomat 5HP502 transmission. Metrodan, Israeli bus company served in Beersheba had Volvo B7L (Mercury bodywork by Merkavim) and Hispano Habit. Kavim had only Mercury Merkavim B7L (except one Hispano Habit), Metropoline had Volvo B7L with Mercury bodywork and Egged had B7L as well.

In 2005, Wrightbus unveiled the Wright StreetCar which is a tram-like articulated bus built with modified B7LA chassis. The chassis has a shorter front overhang, the driver's cab relocated to above the front axle and the radiator relocated to the roof, giving a full-width rear window.

The Volvo B7L was superseded by the Volvo B9L in 2006.

References

See also

 ftr - a trial scheme using Wright StreetCars
 List of buses

B07L
Bus chassis
Low-floor buses
Double-decker buses
Articulated buses
Full-size buses
Tri-axle buses
Vehicles introduced in 1998